The list of current Football Championship Subdivision (FCS) schools that have participated in the playoffs leading to the NCAA Division I Football Championship stands at 92. Known as Division I-AA from 1978 through 2005, it was renamed FCS prior to the 2006 season.

Field
The playoffs began with four teams in 1978, then expanded to eight in 1981, twelve in 1982, and sixteen in 1986. The bracket went to five rounds with a field of twenty teams in 2010, and to 24 teams in 2013.

{| class=wikitable style="text-align:center"
!Years !! Teams !! Byes 
|-
|1978–1980 || 4 || style="background:#DCDCDC;" rowspan=2|
|-
|1981 || 8
|-
|1982–1985 || 12 || 4
|-
|1986–2009 || 16 || 0 
|-
|2010–2012 || 20 || 12 
|-
|2013– || 24 || 8 
|}
Since the 2010 season, the championship game has been played in January, three weeks after the semifinals.
An exception was the 2020 season, delayed until spring 2021 due to COVID-19; it had a reduced field of sixteen teams in the bracket, with the championship game in mid-May, eight days after the semifinals.

Current FCS members
Teams in bold are participating in the 2022 fall postseason.
Results updated through December 3, 2022

No appearances
 ASUN Conference (1) – North Alabama
 Big Sky Conference (1) – Northern Colorado
 Big South Conference (2) – Bryant, Campbell (joining CAA in 2023)
 Mid-Eastern Athletic Conference (1) – North Carolina Central
 Northeast Conference (3) – LIU, Merrimack, Stonehill (Merrimack eligible in 2023, Stonehill eligible in 2026)
 Ohio Valley Conference (1) – Lindenwood (eligible in 2026)
 Patriot League (2) – Bucknell, Georgetown
 Pioneer Football League (7) – Drake, Marist, Morehead State, Presbyterian, St. Thomas (MN), Stetson, Valparaiso (St. Thomas eligible in 2026)
 Southern Conference (1) – Mercer
 Southland Conference (2) – Houston Baptist, Texas A&M–Commerce (Commerce eligible in 2026)
 Southwestern Athletic Conference (6) – Alabama A&M, Alabama State, Arkansas–Pine Bluff, Prairie View A&M, Southern, Texas Southern
 Western Athletic Conference (3) – Abilene Christian, Utah Tech, Tarleton State (Tarleton State and Utah Tech eligible in 2024)

 Ivy League teams do not participate in any postseason in football, citing academic concerns.

Former FCS members
There have been 25 former FCS schools that have participated in the playoffs. Of these, 22 have moved up to the Football Bowl Subdivision (FBS), while the other three no longer sponsor football.

Notes

  Montana's competition in the 2011 Division I FCS Championship was vacated by action of the NCAA Committee on Infractions (record was 2–1).
  Northern Arizona's competition in the 1999 Division I-AA Championship was vacated by action of the NCAA Committee on Infractions (record was 0–1).
  Stephen F. Austin's competition in the 1989 Division I-AA Championship was vacated by action of the NCAA Committee on Infractions (record was 3–1).
  Tennessee State's competition in the 1981 and 1982 Division I-AA Championships was vacated by action of the NCAA Committee on Infractions (record was 1–2).
  Now a member of the Football Bowl Subdivision (FBS).
  During Arkansas State's entire tenure in Division I-AA (1982–1991), the school nickname was Indians. The Red Wolves nickname was adopted in 2008.
  School no longer sponsors football.
  During Troy's entire tenure in Division I-AA (1993–2001), its name was Troy State University. The school adopted its current name in 2005.
  The team was the Northeast Louisiana Indians during its entire tenure in Division I-AA (1982–1993). The school changed its name to the University of Louisiana at Monroe in 1999, and its nickname to Warhawks in 2006.

See also
 List of NCAA Division I FCS football programs
 List of NCAA Division I FBS football bowl records
 List of NCAA Division II Football Championship appearances by team
 List of NCAA Division III Football Championship appearances by team

References
General
 

Specific

External links
 Past winners

Lists of college football team records
Playoff appearances
FCS playoff appearances